Mimbo may refer to:

 A male Bimbo, now referred to as a Himbo
 Palm wine in Cameroonian English